Milad Taji is an Iranian football forward who plays for Rah Ahan in the Iran Pro League.

Club career

Rah Ahan
Taji joined Rah Ahan in summer 2015 with a contract until 2018. He made his professional debut for Rah Ahan on August 6, 2015 in a 2-0 loss against Saipa as a substitute for 
Ahmad Mehdizadeh

Club career statistics

References

External links
 Milad Taji at IranLeague.ir

1993 births
Living people
Iranian footballers
People from Shiraz
Rah Ahan players
Association football forwards
Sportspeople from Fars province